Tong Xiaolin (born 5 January 1956) is a traditional Chinese physician, academician of the Chinese Academy of Sciences (CAS), and professor at Peking University and Beijing University of Chinese Medicine.

Biography
Tong was born in Jilin City, Jilin on January 5, 1956. After the resumption of college entrance examination, he graduated from Changchun University of Chinese Medicine in 1982. He received his master's degree from Wannan Medical College in 1985 and doctor's degree from Nanjing University of Chinese Medicine in 1988, respectively.

Honours and awards
 2009 State Science and Technology Progress Award (Second Class)
 2011 State Science and Technology Progress Award (Second Class)
 November 22, 2019 Member of the Chinese Academy of Sciences (CAS)

References

1956 births
People from Jilin City
Living people
Wannan Medical College alumni
Nanjing University of Chinese Medicine alumni
Members of the Chinese Academy of Sciences
Physicians from Jilin
Academic staff of Peking University
Academic staff of Beijing University of Chinese Medicine